Scott Thomas McGarvey (born 22 April 1963) is a Scottish former footballer who played as a forward.

McGarvey played for Manchester United, and made his debut for the Red Devils on 13 September 1980. Between 1980 and 1983 he made 35 appearances for the club and 12 as a substitute, scoring 5 goals. Left in July 1984 for a sum of £85,000.

Wolverhampton Wanderers, Portsmouth, Bristol City, Carlisle United, Grimsby Town, Oldham Athletic, Derry City of the League of Ireland, non-league Witton Albion and Mazda SC in the Japan Soccer League, Aris Limassol in Cypriot First Division were McGarvey's other clubs. Scott is now managing director of Readies Limited.

References

External links
Profile at StretfordEnd.co.uk

Living people
1963 births
Scottish footballers
Scottish expatriate sportspeople in Japan
Association football forwards
Scottish expatriate footballers
Manchester United F.C. players
Wolverhampton Wanderers F.C. players
English Football League players
Portsmouth F.C. players
Carlisle United F.C. players
Grimsby Town F.C. players
Bristol City F.C. players
Oldham Athletic A.F.C. players
Wigan Athletic F.C. players
Derry City F.C. players
League of Ireland players
Japan Soccer League players
Expatriate footballers in Japan
Witton Albion F.C. players
Cypriot First Division players
Aris Limassol FC players
Expatriate footballers in Cyprus
Scotland under-21 international footballers
Sanfrecce Hiroshima players